Predatoroonops is a genus of goblin spiders endemic to the Brazilian Atlantic Forest. The genus is characterized by the extremely modified male chelicerae and long pairs of ventral spines. It is the first fully revised endemic Brazilian genus of spiders, uncovered in 2012 after two and a half years of research at São Paulo's Instituto Butantan.

The generic name is in honor of the Predator from the eponymous 1987 film, as the researchers found the spiders' chelicerae similar to the creature's unmasked face. All the specific names of the genus reference the film's cast, crew or fictional elements.

Discovery
Predatoroonops was first published in the Bulletin of the American Museum of Natural History in June 2012. The genus is composed of seventeen new species. They are unique for the peculiar morphology of the male chelicerae and the lateral anterior borders of the carapace.

Members of the genus (all of which are endemic to Brazil) were discovered by a team of Brazilian scientists as part of the Planetary Biodiversity Inventory (PBI) project on the goblin spider family (Oonopidae). The team consisted of Alexandre B. Bonaldo, Adalberto J. Santos, Ricardo Ott, and Cristina A. Rheims. It was led by the arachnologist Antonio Domingos Brescovit of Instituto Butantan, who has been studying spiders in the Brazilian Atlantic Forest since 2006. According to Brescovit, the research took two and a half years. Publication was delayed because of the 2010 fire at the Instituto Butantan which destroyed a major part of the institute's specimen collections.

Physiology
They are distinguished by the projected and articulated chelicerae of the males, the conspicuous posterior receptacle of the genitalia of the females, and the spines with pronounced bases on the legs of both sexes. They are usually found in the plant litter on the forest floor. Information on diet and behavior is currently unknown, however, given that all the research was done with dead specimens.

Taxonomy

Predatoroonops schwarzeneggeri, sp. nov., is the type species of the genus. The generic name is a contraction of "Predator Oonops", in reference to the creature of the 1987 film Predator, as the scientists found the distinguished male chelicerae similar to the Predator's unmasked face. The specific names honor the film's cast, crew and elements. For instance, actor Arnold Schwarzenegger, who played protagonist 'Dutch' Schaeffer, was homaged with both Predatoroonops schwarzeneggeri and Predatoroonops dutch.

Two species groups within Predatoroonops were proposed, based on the presence or absence of a median furrow in the frontal median area of the male chelicerae. The schwarzeneggeri group presents both median and subdistal furrows, and a long lateral sclerotized groove at the anterior lateral border of the carapace in males;  the peterhalli group lacks the median and distal furrows, and its species have the anterior lateral border of the carapace with an attenuated groove. The closest relatives of Predatoroonops are in the genera Orchestina and Cavisternum.

Species

References

External links
Predatoroonops photographs and species descriptions at Goblin Spider Planetary Biodiversity Initiative

Oonopidae
Spiders of Brazil
Araneomorphae genera
Predator (franchise)